Munna Mange Memsaab (Hindi: मुन्ना मांगे मेमसाब) is a 2014 Hindi movie. The film stars Omkar Das Manikpuri of Peepli Live fame amongst others.

Cast
 Omkar Das Manikpuri  as Munna
 Razak Khan
  Jordiya Anna 
 Himani Shivpuri
   Mushtak Khan
   Chandu Nangaliya

Production
Munna Mange Memsaab has been in the making for some time now. This film is directed by Shareeph Mansuri Saranawala while Ajay Gupta and Jayshree Bothra are the producers. The film will be distributed by Jai Viratra Entertainment Limited.

References

External links
 

2014 films
2010s Hindi-language films